Clatsop County  is one of the 36 counties in the U.S. state of Oregon. As of the 2020 census, the population was 41,072. The county seat is Astoria. The county is named for the Clatsop tribe of Native Americans, who lived along the coast of the Pacific Ocean prior to European settlement. Clatsop County comprises the Astoria, OR Micropolitan Statistical Area, or Sunset Empire, and is located in Northwest Oregon.

History
The Lewis and Clark Expedition stayed for the winter of 1805–6 in the area, establishing Fort Clatsop as one of the earliest American structures on the west coast of North America. Astoria, Oregon's oldest settlement, was established as a fur trading post in 1811 and named after John Jacob Astor.

Clatsop County was created from the northern and western portions of the original Twality District on June 22, 1844. Until the creation of Vancouver District five days later, Clatsop County extended north across the Columbia into present-day Washington. The Provisional and Territorial Legislatures further altered Clatsop County's boundaries in 1845 and 1853.

Before 1850 most of Clatsop County's government activity occurred in Lexington, a community located where Warrenton is now. However, commercial and social activities came to center on Astoria as that city grew, and an election in 1854 chose Astoria to be the new county seat.

Fort Stevens, located near the peninsula formed by the south shore of the Columbia river and the Pacific Ocean, became the only continental US military installation attacked in World War II, when submarine I-25 of the Imperial Japanese Navy fired 17 rounds at the base on June 21, 1942. The submarine escaped when the order was given not to return fire with the  shore guns. While the damage caused was slight (reportedly only a baseball backstop was damaged and a powerline severed), the presence of the enemy ship sowed panic along the Pacific coast of the United States, and other minor attacks occurred elsewhere in the region, including Vancouver Island.

In 1975, Clatsop County commissioners considered seceding from Oregon and becoming a part of Washington. The movement was based on disagreements residents of the county had with Governor Bob Straub. The movement was created after Alumax Corporation canceled their plans to build a plant in the county. Some residents, including two county commissioners, blamed the Oregon Governor for the relocation of the plant. The State of Washington's Governor, Daniel J. Evans, said the county was not welcome in the state  and Clatsop County commissioners later abandoned the idea.

Geography
The highest point is Saddle Mountain at 3,283 feet (1,001 m), part of the Northern Oregon Coast Range.

Major highways
  U.S. Route 26
  U.S. Route 30
  U.S. Route 101

National protected areas
 Julia Butler Hansen National Wildlife Refuge (part)
 Lewis and Clark National Historical Park (part)
 Lewis and Clark National Wildlife Refuge
 Oregon Islands National Wildlife Refuge (part)

Demographics

2000 census
As of the census of 2000, there were 35,630 people, 14,703 households, and 9,454 families living in the county. The population density was 43 people per square mile (17/km2). There were 19,685 housing units at an average density of 24 per square mile (9/km2). The racial makeup of the county was 93.14% White or European American, 0.52% Black or African American, 1.03% Native American, 1.21% Asian, 0.17% Pacific Islander, 1.64% from other races, and 2.30% from two or more races. 4.48% of the population were Hispanic or Latino of any race. 15.3% were of German, 10.8% English, 10.4% Irish, 9.3% American and 6.5% Norwegian ancestry.

There were 14,703 households, out of which 28.50% had children under the age of 18 living with them, 50.60% were married couples living together, 9.70% had a female householder with no husband present, and 35.70% were non-families. 29.50% of all households were made up of individuals, and 11.70% had someone living alone who was 65 years of age or older. The average household size was 2.35 and the average family size was 2.88.

In the county, the population was spread out, with 23.70% under the age of 18, 8.90% from 18 to 24, 25.30% from 25 to 44, 26.60% from 45 to 64, and 15.60% who were 65 years of age or older. The median age was 40 years. For every 100 females there were 97.80 males. For every 100 females age 18 and over, there were 95.10 males.

The median income for a household in the county was $36,301, and the median income for a family was $44,575. Males had a median income of $32,153 versus $22,479 for females. The per capita income for the county was $19,515. About 9.10% of families and 13.20% of the population were below the poverty line, including 16.80% of those under age 18 and 8.00% of those age 65 or over.

2010 census
As of the 2010 United States Census, there were 37,039 people, 15,742 households, and 9,579 families living in the county. The racial makeup of the county was 90.9% white, 1.2% Asian, 1.0% American Indian, 0.5% black or African American, 0.2% Pacific islander, 3.3% from other races, and 2.8% from two or more races. Those of Hispanic or Latino origin made up 7.7% of the population. In terms of ancestry, 22.8% were German, 15.4% were English, 14.2% were Irish, 8.9% were American, and 7.5% were Norwegian.

Of the 15,742 households, 26.0% had children under the age of 18 living with them, 46.4% were married couples living together, 9.6% had a female householder with no husband present, 39.2% were non-families, and 31.5% of all households were made up of individuals. The average household size was 2.29 and the average family size was 2.85. The median age was 43.2 years.

The median income for a household in the county was $42,223 and the median income for a family was $52,339. Males had a median income of $40,741 versus $28,463 for females. The per capita income for the county was $25,347. About 9.6% of families and 12.8% of the population were below the poverty line, including 20.0% of those under age 18 and 6.6% of those age 65 or over.

Economy 

The principal industries of Clatsop County are manufacturing, travel (primarily tourism), and trade. Fishing and timber are still important but contribute proportionally less to the county's employment and income than they used to. The county's average nonfarm employment was 17,480 in 2007. About 30% of the lands within the county boundaries belong to the state of Oregon, as part of the state forests. The Port of Astoria was created in 1914 to support trade and commerce.

Tourism
Astoria, Oregon, the county seat, has multiple tourist attractions including the Astoria Riverfront Trolley, Fort Clatsop, the Uppertown Firefighters Museum, and Columbia River Maritime Museum. Seaside, Oregon, noted as Oregon's oldest ocean resort community, also has multiple tourist attractions including, the Seaside Aquarium, and the Seaside Historical Society Museum. Tourism is noted as one of the major forces in Clatsop County's economy.

Communities

Cities
 Astoria (county seat)
 Cannon Beach
 Gearhart
 Seaside
 Warrenton

Census-designated places
 Jeffers Garden

 Knappa
 River Point

 Svensen

 Westport

Unincorporated communities

 Arch Cape
 Bradwood
 Brownsmead
 Carnahan
 Clifton
 Elsie
 Fern Hill
 Fort Stevens 
 Grand Rapids
 Hamlet
 Hammond 
 Jewell
 Jewell Junction
 Lukarilla
 Melville
 Miles Crossing
 Mishawaka 
 Navy Heights
 Necanicum 
 Oklahoma Hill
 Olney
 Skipanon
 Sunset Beach
 Surf Pines
 Svensen Junction
 Taylorville
 Tolovana Park 
 Tongue Point Village 
 Uniontown
 Vesper
 Vinemaple
 Wauna

Politics
Like all of the northern Oregon coast, Clatsop County was consistently Republican up to and including the 1928 election, except in 1912 when third-party former President Theodore Roosevelt won by one vote with the lowest percentage for a winning candidate in any county since the Civil War. Since Franklin D. Roosevelt won the county in 1932 Clatsop has generally been carried by the Democratic candidate in Presidential elections. The only exception to this is Dwight D. Eisenhower who won the county twice, making this Oregon county the one to have gone the longest without supporting a Republican nominee. However, George McGovern won by just nineteen votes in 1972, and Walter Mondale by a mere three votes (or 0.019887 percent) in 1984.

In gubernatorial elections, the county has been won by the Democratic Party candidate since 1982, starting with a streak of seven consecutive elections with the Democratic Party carrying Clatsop County. That winning streak ended in 2014, with GOP Gubernatorial candidate, Dennis Richardson unexpectedly carrying Clatsop County with a final vote total of 6,550 votes (46.33 percent) for the Republican and 6,449 votes (45.62 percent) cast for the Democrat and future governor-elect, John Kitzhaber

Clatsop County is located in Oregon's 1st congressional district, which has a Cook Partisan Voting Index of D+18 and is represented by Suzanne Bonamici. In the Oregon State Senate it is represented by Democrat Betsy Johnson. In the Oregon House of Representatives it is represented by Democrat Brad Witt and Republican Suzanne Weber.

See also
 National Register of Historic Places listings in Clatsop County, Oregon

References

Further reading
 Emma Gene Miller, Clatsop County, Oregon: Its History, Legends and Industries. Portland, OR: Binfords & Mort, 1958.
 

 
Oregon placenames of Native American origin
1844 establishments in Oregon Country
Populated places established in 1844